Artesia High School is a public high school in Lakewood, California, with a student population of around 1,500. It is one of the five high schools in the ABC Unified School District.

History
Construction of Artesia High was completed in 1954, making it the oldest active high school in the ABC Unified School District since the 1979 closure of Excelsior High School, then known as the Excelsior Union High School District.

The opening ceremony of the school was highlighted with a speech by then-Vice President Richard Nixon. In his speech he expressed his hope that Artesia High School would serve as an example of educational integration, in light of the Brown v. Board of Education ruling passed only a few months before. The school mascot is the Pioneer.

Academics
The school is part of the Mathematics, Engineering, Science Achievement program and is under the direct guidance of California State University, Long Beach. The school's 2009 Academic Performance Index score was 745. 
In 2013, Artesia High was designated as a California Distinguished School.

Athletics
Artesia High School is a member of the 605 League of the CIF Southern Section and is renowned for its competitive sports teams. The boys' basketball team, which featured future NBA All-Star James Harden, was ranked first in California during the 2005–2006 season. The school won the CIF Division III championship with a record of 33 wins and a single loss. The 2006 win was the second time in the school's history that the team won the California Basketball championship. The Pioneers have a total of 5 state championships, ranking fourth in the state in terms of state championships.

On March 24, 2007, the boys' basketball team defeated Bishop O'Dowd High School from Oakland for the CIF Division III State Championship title, and celebrated Artesia's second back-to-back D-III title and fifth overall state championship.

Notable alumni

 Joel Adamson - Major League Baseball pitcher
 Dick Wantz - Major League Baseball pitcher
 Memo Arzate - soccer, graduated 1999
 Stephen Burton - football, Graduated in 2007 Minnesota Vikings
 Tony Farmer - professional basketball player
 James Harden - NBA player on the Philadelphia 76ers, 2017–2018 season MVP
 Jason Kapono - basketball, Panathinaikos B.C.
 Abner Mares - professional boxer
 Jack Michael Martínez - basketball, Dominican Republic national basketball team and Europe
 Armando Muniz - Olympic and professional boxer
 Ed O'Bannon - basketball player for UCLA 1995 national champions and in NBA
 Charles O'Bannon - basketball player for UCLA 1995 national champions and in NBA
 Ryan Reyes - basketball, Cal State Fullerton and PBA (Philippine Basketball Association)
 Orlando Scandrick - football, Dallas Cowboys, played football at school before transferring to Los Alamitos
 Jón Arnór Stefánsson - basketball, NBA and Europe
 Tom Tolbert - basketball, NBA player and analyst, sports talk show host

References

External links
 OFFICIAL SCHOOL WEBSITE: https://www.artesiahs.us/

Educational institutions established in 1954
ABC Unified School District
High schools in Los Angeles County, California
Public high schools in California
1954 establishments in California
Lakewood, California